Franklin Sumner Earle (September 4, 1856 – January 31, 1929) was an American mycologist who specialized in the diseases and cultivation of sugar cane. He was the first mycologist to work at the New York Botanical Garden, and was the author of The Genera of North American Gill Fungi.

Life
Frankin Sumner Earle was born in Dwight, Illinois, on September 4, 1856, to Parker Earle and Melanie Tracy. He spent much of his early youth at the Earle farm. Later he attended the University of Illinois at Urbana–Champaign sporadically in the 1880s, but never earned a degree. He studied with the mycologist Thomas Jonathan Burrill.

Soon after college, Earle served as the superintendent of the Mississippi Agriculture Experiment Station (1892–1895). Soon after that Earle worked as a biologist and horticulturist of the Alabama Agriculture Experiment Station (1895–1900).

Earle worked as an Assistant Curator in charge of mycological collections at the New York Botanical Garden in 1901.

His sister was the fiction writer, Mary Tracy Earle.

References

External links

Franklin Sumner Earle Records- New York Botanical Garden 
Josephine Skehan and the Mountains Near Gray

1856 births
1929 deaths
American mycologists
American botanists
People from Livingston County, Illinois
University of Illinois Urbana-Champaign alumni
New York Botanical Garden